The Sioux City Cowboys were a minor league baseball team that played in the Western League (1934–1937), Nebraska State League (1938) and another incarnation of the Western League (1939). The team, based in Sioux City, Iowa, was affiliated with the Detroit Tigers in 1937 and 1939. It was the first team to be based in Sioux City since 1924. They played at Stockyards Park.

The team made the playoffs in four of its six seasons, reaching the league finals three times and winning the league championship once, in 1939 under managers Pete Monahan and Jimmy Zinn.

Major league alumni

The club featured numerous notable ballplayers. Hall of Famer Dave Bancroft managed the team in 1936.

1934: Hooks Cotter, Guy Curtright, Hal Luby, Art Parks, Biggs Wehde, Hugh Willingham, Icehouse Wilson, Dutch Zwilling (manager)

1935: Luby, Wehde, Willingham

1936: Bancroft (player/manager), Marty Berghammer (manager), Clarence Fieber, Luby, Jug Thesenga

1937: Rube Fischer, Fred Frink, Maury Newlin, Ralph Onis, Steve Rachunok, Thesenga, Ed Weiland, Roger Wolff

1938: Fischer, Wehde

1939: Wehde, Zinn (player/manager)

References

Defunct minor league baseball teams
Baseball teams established in 1934
Baseball teams disestablished in 1939
1934 establishments in Iowa
1939 disestablishments in Iowa
Defunct baseball teams in Iowa
Defunct Western League teams
Detroit Tigers minor league affiliates
Nebraska State League teams